Johannes Max Brückner (5 August 1860 – 1 November 1934) was a German geometer, known for his collection of polyhedral models.

Education and career 
Brückner was born in Hartau, in the Kingdom of Saxony, a town that is now part of Zittau, Germany. He completed a Ph.D. at Leipzig University in 1886, supervised by Felix Klein and Wilhelm Scheibner, with a dissertation concerning conformal maps. After teaching at a grammar school in Zwickau, he moved to the gymnasium in Bautzen.

Brückner is known for making many geometric models, particularly of stellated and uniform polyhedra, which he documented in his book Vielecke und Vielflache: Theorie und Geschichte (Polygons and polyhedra: Theory and History, Leipzig: B. G. Teubner, 1900). The shapes first studied in this book include the final stellation of the icosahedron and the compound of three octahedra, made famous by M. C. Escher's print Stars.
Joseph Malkevitch lists the publication of this book, which documented all that was known on polyhedra at the time, as one of 25 milestones in the history of polyhedra. Malkevitch writes that the book's "beautiful pictures of uniform polyhedra ... served as an inspiration to people later".

Brückner died on November 1, 1934 in Bautzen.

Honors and awards 
Brückner was an invited speaker at the International Congress of Mathematicians in 1904, 1908, 1912, and 1928. In 1930–1931 he donated his model collection to Heidelberg University, and the university in turn gave him an honorary doctorate in 1931.

Bibliography 
 Die Elemente der vierdimensionalen Geometrie mit besonderer Berücksichtigung der Polytope, Jahresbericht des Vereins für Naturkunde zu Zwickau 1893
 Vielecke und Vielflache – Theorie und Geschichte, Teubner, Leipzig, 1900
 Über die gleicheckig-gleichflächigen, diskontinuierlichen und nichtkonvexen Polyeder. dans: Abhandlungen der kaiserlichen leopoldinisch-carolinischen deutschen Akademie der Naturforscher, vol. 86, p. 1–348, Halle 1906.

References 

1860 births
1934 deaths
19th-century German mathematicians
Geometers
Leipzig University alumni
20th-century German mathematicians
Heidelberg University alumni
People from Zittau